Hugo Strauß (25 June 1907 – 3 November 1941) was a German rower who competed in the 1936 Summer Olympics.

In 1936 he won the gold medal with his partner Willi Eichhorn in the coxless pair competition. Strauß was 29 at the time he won, it was also the only time he was in the Olympics. Also in 1936 Germany went on to win the Olympics that year. He was killed during WWII while serving on the Eastern Front.

References

External links
 
 Hugo Strauß's Olympic record
 Willi Eichhorn's Olympic record

1907 births
1941 deaths
Olympic rowers of Germany
Rowers at the 1936 Summer Olympics
Olympic gold medalists for Germany
Olympic medalists in rowing
German male rowers
Medalists at the 1936 Summer Olympics
German military personnel killed in World War II
Sportspeople from Mannheim